Big Cliff Dam is a concrete gravity dam on the North Santiam River in the western part of the U.S. state of Oregon. The dam spans the Linn County–Marion County border in the Oregon Cascades.

The dam's primary functions are flood control, power generation, irrigation, fish habitat, water quality improvement, and recreation.  It is one of 13 dams created by the U.S. Army Corps of Engineers under the Willamette Valley Project which was authorized by the Flood Control Act of 1938.

It was constructed between March 1949 and May 1953 at the same time as Detroit Dam. Big Cliff is  river distance below Detroit Dam at river mile 47 of the North Santiam River.

Big Cliff smooths river flow resulting from power generation fluctuations of Detroit Dam, a practice known as river re-regulation.

Big Cliff can generate up to 18 megawatts of power.

The dams' operators try to keep the water temperature in the  range for ideal fish habitat by mixing water from the top of Detroit Lake with water from the bottom.

References

External links 

 720p Video 'Tainter gates at Big Cliff Dam' shot below the gates
 USACE Detroit/Big Cliff Dams Interim Temperature Operations Study Phase I Technical Report (PDF) provides data for water quality, temperature, power generation, salmon egg viability, fish catch rate, etc.
 Big Cliff recent telemetry (PDF)

Dams in Oregon
Hydroelectric power plants in Oregon
Buildings and structures in Linn County, Oregon
Buildings and structures in Marion County, Oregon
United States Army Corps of Engineers dams
Dams completed in 1953
Energy infrastructure completed in 1953
1953 establishments in Oregon
Gravity dams
Dams in the Columbia Basin